Gleaning is a post-harvest agricultural process.

Glean may also refer to:

Gleaning (birds), a feeding process in birds similar to the agricultural process
Glean (album), a 2015 album by They Might Be Giants
Glean, a 2004 album by Echobrain
Carlyle Glean (born 1932), Grenadian politician
Marion Patrick Jones (1934–2016), Trinidadian novelist also known as Marion Glean

See also
Gleaner (disambiguation)